John Thomas Haig,  (December 15, 1877 – October 23, 1962) was a politician in Manitoba, Canada.  He served as parliamentary leader of the Manitoba Conservative Party in 1921–22.

Born in Colborne, Ontario, Haig received his BA from the University of Manitoba, was called to the Manitoba bar in 1904 and worked as a Barrister-at-law.  In 1907, he married Josephine M. Dickie. He was elected to the Winnipeg Public School Board in 1908, and continued to hold this position after entering provincial politics, also serving as board chairman. In 1927, Haig was named King's Counsel. He was president of the Manitoba Curling Association and of the Assiniboia Lawn-Bowling Club.

Haig was first elected to the Legislative Assembly of Manitoba for Assiniboia in 1914.  He was soundly defeated in the Liberal landslide of 1915, but returned to the legislature in 1920 at the head of the Conservative Party list in Winnipeg. (Winnipeg elections were determined by a form of proportional representation at this time.)

Conservative leader R.G. Willis was unable to win a seat in the 1920 election, and Haig was called to lead the eight-member caucus in parliament. He ran for the party's leadership in April 1922, but was defeated by Major Fawcett Taylor.

Haig was re-elected to the legislature in 1922, 1927 and 1932, and remained an important voice for the party.

In August 1935, he was appointed to the Senate of Canada on the recommendation of Prime Minister R.B. Bennett. From 1945 until 1957, Haig was Leader of the Opposition in the Senate for the Progressive Conservative Party. After the 1957 federal election, Haig joined the Cabinet of John Diefenbaker, serving as Minister without portfolio and Leader of the Government in the Senate until May 11, 1958.

He retired from the Senate on January 17, 1962 due to poor health.

Haig died in Winnipeg at the age of 84.

His son James Campbell Haig also served in the Senate.

References 

1877 births
1962 deaths
Canadian senators from Manitoba
Progressive Conservative Party of Manitoba MLAs
Conservative Party of Canada (1867–1942) senators
Lawyers in Manitoba
Members of the King's Privy Council for Canada
Progressive Conservative Party of Canada senators
University of Manitoba alumni
Canadian King's Counsel